The Swaziland Communist Party (SWACOPA) was a communist party in Eswatini. SWACOPA was founded around 1994. It was led by Mphandlana Shongwe and Zakhe Genindza.

SWACOPA's activities were suppressed by the regime, and several cadres detained. Following the removal of the 1973 decree to make way for the new constitution, the party has been one of the first to register as an official political party.

References

1994 establishments in Swaziland
Banned communist parties
Communist parties in Africa
Defunct communist parties
Defunct political parties in Eswatini
Political parties established in 1994
Political parties with year of disestablishment missing
Socialism in Eswatini